In enzymology, a -iditol 2-dehydrogenase is an enzyme that catalyzes the chemical reaction

-iditol + NAD+  -sorbose + NADH + H+

Thus, the two substrates of this enzyme are -iditol and NAD+, whereas its 3 products are -sorbose, NADH, and H+.

This enzyme belongs to the family of oxidoreductases, specifically those acting on the CH-OH group of donor with NAD+ or NADP+ as acceptor. The systematic name of this enzyme class is -iditol:NAD+ 2-oxidoreductase. This enzyme is also called -sorbitol dehydrogenase. This enzyme participates in pentose and glucuronate interconversions and fructose and mannose metabolism.

References 

 

EC 1.1.1
NADH-dependent enzymes
Enzymes of unknown structure